OYD may refer to:

 OYD, a general service variation of the Bedford OY truck
 Office of Youth Development, former name of the Louisiana Office of Juvenile Justice